The New Era Cap Company is an American headwear company headquartered in Buffalo, New York. It was founded in 1920. New Era has over 500 different licenses in its portfolio. Since 1993 they have been the exclusive baseball cap supplier for Major League Baseball (MLB).

History
In 1920, Ehrhardt Koch borrowed $1,000 from his sister, Rose, and $1,000 from his co-worker Joe and started his own cap company, the "E. Koch Cap Company." Production started on the third floor of 1830 Genesee Street in Buffalo, New York. The company started with 14 employees, including Ehrhardt’s sister Rose, Ehrhardt's son, Harold, and Rose's son Wally Domas. In 1920, the company produced 60,000 caps.

In 1934, New Era began producing caps for the Cleveland Indians, which would be their first Major League Baseball (MLB) contract. In 1954, the company’s fitted pro cap was modernized, redesigned and named the 59Fifty, aka the "Brooklyn Style" cap, by Harold Koch, who introduced many design improvements and innovations while head of New Era. By 1965, New Era was supplying caps to about half of the 20 MLB teams. In 1993, New Era was granted the first exclusive license with MLB to produce the on-field baseball caps for all of its (then 28, now 30) teams.

In 2001, Chris Koch was named CEO. In the 2010s, while New Era had long been associated with baseball, the company focused on delving into football and other sports leagues. In 2012, it acquired full exclusive sideline rights for the National Football League (NFL). In 2013, New Era signed with Australian cricket's Big Bash League as their official cap provider. New Era signed an additional deal in 2015 with Manchester United. In 2017, New Era signed exclusive rights for NBA on-court products. This made New Era the first headwear company to have exclusive rights for MLB, the NFL, and the NBA simultaneously.

It was announced on August 13, 2016, that New Era and the Buffalo Bills reached an agreement for naming rights for Ralph Wilson Stadium. The Bills and New Era officially announced the stadium's new name of New Era Field five days later, on August 18, 2016. After the Bills released CEO Russ Brandon in May 2018, New Era hired Brandon in an executive position. A day later, New Era denied the hiring had taken place. The Athletic, which made the initial claim, continues to insist the hiring happened and that Brandon had been quietly fired after the story broke. The stadium sponsorship agreement was ended at New Era's request in 2020, and the stadium was renamed Bills Stadium.

On September 12, 2018, it was announced that New Era would be the official outfitter for the Canadian Football League starting in the 2019 season. The company has been a licensee of the CFL for headwear and apparel since January 2011 and it will be the first time that the company provides football uniforms and sideline apparel.

On the 22nd April 2021 it was announced that New Era would become a Merchandise Partner of the 2021 Rugby League World Cup.

New Era also makes a 9FIFTY “SnapBack” version of their popular hats.  New Era makes hats with logos from all major sports teams, as well as special edition & custom made hats.

Cap recalls
In the summer of 2007, New Era voluntarily pulled three styles of New York Yankees hats from shelves across the country because the designs on the caps were seen to be gang-related. There were three caps that stood out; two with a bandanna like pattern around the top and one with a gold crown. Brian Martinez, an NYPD detective involved with Peace on the Street said "Bandannas represent gang flags," "New Era is making it really convenient for gang members, because now your flag is part of your hat." The patterns on the hats were similar to the flags of the Crips, the Bloods and the Latin Kings. Much of the New York public protested about the caps and in response to these allegations, a New Era spokesperson stated that the company does not market to gangs and when notified by activist groups and public officials, the company took immediate action.

Sponsorship

Football

Club teams 
  Shibuya City  (From 2023 season)

References

External links
 

 
Sportswear brands
Sporting goods manufacturers of the United States
Clothing companies of the United States